Liz Michelle de León Paz (born December 2, 1969 in Ciudad de Panamá, Panamá), is a Panamanian beauty winner of the Señorita Panamá 1990 title. Also represented Panama in Miss Universe 1991, the 40th Miss Universe pageant was held at Aladdin Theatre for the Performing Arts, Paradise, United States on May 17, 1991.

She represented Panamá Centro state.

References

External links
Señorita Panamá  official website 
Miss Panama

Living people
Miss Universe 1991 contestants
Panamanian beauty pageant winners
Señorita Panamá
1969 births